Pedro Andrés Verde Erbetta (born 6 March 1949) was an Argentine professional footballer who played as a forward for Club Estudiantes de La Plata, and briefly Sheffield United

Club career
Pedro Verde began his career in Argentina in 1969 playing for Estudiantes de La Plata. He played for the La Plata club until 1973, a club where he scored 13 goals in 90 games. That year he went to Spain to join the squad of UD Las Palmas, a club in which he remained firm until 1977. That year he joined Hércules CF, where he stayed until 1979. In 1979 Verde moved to England to join the ranks of Sheffield United, where he ended his career as a professional footballer in 1980.

In his playing career he scored 26 goals in 200 games.

International career
Verde represented the Argentina national team three times.

Personal life
Pedro Verde is the uncle of former footballer Juan Sebastián Verón.

References

External links
 
 

Living people
1949 births
People from General Pico
Argentine footballers
Association football midfielders
Argentina international footballers
La Liga players
Estudiantes de La Plata footballers
Hércules CF players
UD Las Palmas players
Sheffield United F.C. players
Argentine expatriate footballers
Argentine expatriate sportspeople in Spain
Expatriate footballers in Spain
Argentine expatriate sportspeople in England
Expatriate footballers in England
Verón/Verde family